Sir Eric Newton Griffith-Jones KBE CMG QC (1 November 1913 – 13 February 1979) was a British lawyer and administrator who served as Attorney General of Kenya between 1955 and 1961.

Early life

Griffith-Jones was born in Singapore in 1913 to Oswald Phillips Griffith-Jones and his wife Edith. His paternal aunt was Anne Griffith-Jones. He was educated at Cheltenham College and was called to the bar at Gray's Inn in 1934.

Career

On completing his studies, he joined the Colonial Legal Service and in 1935 began his career as a solicitor and advocate in Straits Settlements and Johor. In 1939 he became Crown Counsel in Singapore. He saw active military service during the Second World War and was a prisoner of war between 1942 and 1945. After the war, he resumed his legal career as a Crown Counsel in the Malayan Union.

In the early 1950s, he moved to Kenya and was made Queen's Counsel in 1954. The following year, he was appointed Attorney-General and Minister for Legal Affairs. He served as Acting Governor in 1962–63. In 1963 he succeeded Sir John Hay as head of Guthrie and oversaw a restructuring of the group. He spent his later years on the board of several companies.

Death

He died on 13 February 1979, at 65.

References

1913 births
1979 deaths
British colonial governors and administrators in Africa
British Kenya people
Colonial governors and administrators of Kenya
People educated at Cheltenham College
Colonial Legal Service officers
Knights Commander of the Order of the British Empire
Companions of the Order of St Michael and St George
20th-century King's Counsel
People from Singapore